Balanga is one of the eleven Local governments in Gombe State￼￼, Nigeria. It falls under the southern senatorial district of the state. Its administrative headquarters is located at Talasse town. The LGA is bordered by Yemaltu-Deba LGA to the north while to the south and east by Adamawa state and to the west by Shongom, Kaltungo and Akko LGA.

Geography 
Balanga LGA encompasses a total area of 1,626 square kilometres.

Climate

Population 
The population of Balanga is estimated at 176,944 inhabitants with the huge majority being from members of the Hausa, Fulani and Waja tribes.

Postal Code 
The postal code of the area is 761.

Languages 

Hausa, Fulfulde and Waja languages are spoken extensively in the area.

Religion 
Islam is the most commonly practiced religion in Balanga.

Other settlements 
The Loojaa settlement in Balanga Local Government Area is home to the extinct Jalaa language (bàsàrə̀n dà jàlààbè̩), a language isolate also known as Centúúm or Cen Tuum.

Government 
The chairman of the LGA is Garba Umar

Communal clashes 
On July 21, 2021, there was a communal violence where five people were injured and at least two houses burnt in Nyuwar community of Balanga. This led to the placement of Nyuwar, Jessu, Heme, Yolde Gilingitu, Sikam, Wala-Lunguda and environs under curfew.

References

Local Government Areas in Gombe State